Phoneutria reidyi is a species of venomous spiders in the family Ctenidae, found in South America (Colombia, Venezuela, Peru, Brazil and Guyana).

This species is characterized by a double dark dorsal band on the palp, white spots in the abdominal dorsal pattern, the female anterior legs ventrally have a yellow femur, while in males it is very dark. Like other Phoneutria, P. reidyi is venomous and should be treated with caution, its venom has a median lethal dose of 0.11 mg / kg.

References

Ctenidae
Spiders of South America
Spiders described in 1897